Absent Lovers: Live in Montreal is a live album (2-CD set) by the band King Crimson, recorded 11 July 1984, and released in 1998.  This was taken from the final night of their 1984 tour and would subsequently be King Crimson's last performance until the warm-up shows in Argentina ten years later for the later-to-be-released album THRAK.

Track listing

Personnel
King Crimson
 Robert Fripp – electric guitar, guitar synthesizer, mixing, mastering, production
 Adrian Belew – electric guitar, drums, vocals
 Tony Levin – bass guitar, Chapman Stick, synthesizer, backing vocals, photography
 Bill Bruford – drums, electronic drums, percussion

Technical staff
George Glossop – live mixing
Brad Davis – recording engineer
David Singleton – mixing, mastering, engineering, editing
Alex Mundy – assistant engineering
SADiE – digital editing
DOCdata – glass master

Visual staff
P. J. Crook – paintings "Absent Lovers I & II"
Steve Ball – "Discipline" logo
Hugh O'Donnell – sleeve design
Ryūji Sasaki (uncredited) – director of Three of a Perfect Pair live video (stills used on liner notes)

References

1998 live albums
King Crimson live albums
Discipline Global Mobile albums
Albums produced by Robert Fripp